The Stugunøset in the Filefjeld (Norwegian - Stugunøset på Filefjeld, Stugunøset på Fillefjell or Stugunøset på Filefjell) is an 1851 painting by JC Dahl, now in the National Gallery of Norway in Oslo. It shows the Støgonøse mountain in the Filefjell area in the Valdres district and was painted just after the artist's last trip to Valdres in 1850, aged 62. He based it on a sketch he had made on the high mountain ridge north of Utrøvatnet.

In 1852 it was sold to the Christiania Art Society, which sold it the following year to Wilhelm Adelsten Maribo, who left it to its current owner in 1901.

Sources
http://www.google.com/culturalinstitute/asset-viewer/stugun%C3%B8set-at-filefjell/IwH09jau3mEorg?projectId=art-project

Landscape paintings
1851 paintings
Paintings in the collection of the National Gallery (Norway)
Paintings by Johan Christian Dahl